This is a list of fictional assassins and bounty hunters.

References

 
 
 
Assassins